Transformation/transcription domain-associated protein, also known as TRRAP, is a protein that in humans is encoded by the TRRAP gene. TRRAP belongs to the phosphatidylinositol 3-kinase-related kinase protein family.

Function 
TRRAP is an adaptor protein, which is found in various multiprotein chromatin complexes with histone acetyltransferase activity (HAT), which in turn is responsible for epigenetic transcription activation. TRRAP has a central role in MYC (c-Myc) transcription activation, and also participates in cell transformation by MYC. It is required for p53/TP53-, E2F1-, and E2F4-mediated transcription activation. It is also involved in transcription activation mediated by the adenovirus E1A, a viral oncoprotein that deregulates transcription of key genes.

TRRAP is also required for the mitotic checkpoint and normal cell cycle progression. The MRN complex (composed of MRE11, RAD50, and NBS1) is involved in the detection and repair of DNA double-strand breaks (DSBs). TRRAP associates with the MRN complex and when TRRAP is removed, the complex shows reduced cDNA end-joining activity. Hence, TRRAP may function as a link between DSB repair and chromatin remodeling.

Model organisms

Model organisms have been used in the study of TRRAP function. A conditional knockout mouse line, called Trraptm1a(EUCOMM)Wtsi was generated as part of the International Knockout Mouse Consortium program — a high-throughput mutagenesis project to generate and distribute animal models of disease to interested scientists.

Male and female animals underwent a standardized phenotypic screen to determine the effects of deletion. Twenty four tests were carried out on mutant mice and two significant abnormalities were observed. No homozygous mutant embryos were identified during gestation, and therefore none survived until weaning. The remaining tests were carried out on heterozygous mutant adult mice; no significant abnormalities were observed in these animals.

Interactions 

Transformation/transcription domain-associated protein has been shown to interact with:
 ACTL6A, 
 EP400,
 MAX, 
 Myc, 
 PCAF, 
 SUPT3H, and
 TAF9.  and

References

Further reading 

 
 
 
 
 
 
 
 
 
 
 
 
 
 
 
 
 
 
 

Genes mutated in mice